"Bad Blood" is a song by American singer-songwriter Taylor Swift, taken from her fifth studio album 1989 (2014). Swift wrote the song with its producers Max Martin and Shellback. The album track is a pop song with stomping drums. A hip hop remix of "Bad Blood", featuring American rapper Kendrick Lamar and additional production by Ilya, was released as the fourth single from 1989 on May 17, 2015, by Big Machine and Republic Records.

The lyrics are about feelings of betrayal by a close friend. Upon the album's release, critics expressed mixed opinions about "Bad Blood", with some complimenting Swift's defiant attitude and dubbing it an album highlight, while others criticized its production and lyrics. The remixed single was praised for the reworked instrumentation and Lamar's verses, which others considered to be out of place on a pop song. Media outlets speculated that American singer Katy Perry is the subject of the song. The remix received a Grammy nomination for Best Pop Duo/Group Performance.

"Bad Blood" was supported by a high-budget music video directed by Joseph Kahn and produced by Swift. It featured an ensemble cast consisting of many singers, actresses and fashion models, which received wide media coverage. Critics praised the video for its cinematic and futuristic visuals inspired by neo-noir styles. It won a Grammy Award for Best Music Video, and two MTV Video Music Awards for the Video of the Year and Best Collaboration. Commercially, "Bad Blood" reached number one in Australia, Canada, New Zealand, and Scotland, as well as the United States, where it topped the Billboard Hot 100, Adult Top 40 and Mainstream Top 40 charts. It has been certified triple platinum in Australia and Canada, and 6× platinum in the US.

Background and release
Taylor Swift's fifth studio album, 1989, was inspired by 1980s synth-pop. The album's electronic production using synthesizers, programmed drums, and processed backing vocals marked a departure from the country styles of her previous releases. On 1989, Swift and Swedish producer Max Martin served as executive producers. Martin and his frequent collaborator Shellback produced seven out of thirteen songs on the album's standard edition, including "Bad Blood". The album was released in October 2014 to commercial success, selling over one million copies within a week.

"Bad Blood" was released as the fourth single from 1989. The remix version featuring rapper Kendrick Lamar was released on May 17, 2015, for digital download by Big Machine Records. The single release was supported by the premiere of its music video at the 2015 Billboard Music Awards. "Bad Blood" impacted US contemporary hit radio on May 19, 2015, under Big Machine and Republic Records imprint. The song was released to Italian contemporary hit radio on June 12, 2015, through Universal Music Group.

Writing and composition

Swift wrote "Bad Blood" about an undisclosed female musician. She revealed in a 2014 interview with Rolling Stone that this female peer, whom she had thought of as a close friend of hers, attempted to sabotage one of her concert tours by hiring people who worked for her. Upon the release of 1989, various publications speculated that Katy Perry was the subject of the song; Perry and Swift were involved in a heavily publicized feud that received widespread media coverage. Several publications including Time and The Washington Post noted parallels between the lyric "If you live like that, you live with ghosts" in "Bad Blood" and the title of "Ghost", a song from Perry's 2013 album Prism. Some critics initially interpreted "Bad Blood" to be about lost romance, which is the central theme of 1989. According to several media outlets, Perry's 2017 single "Swish Swish" is a diss track responding to "Bad Blood".

"Bad Blood" was recorded by Sam Holland at Conway Recording Studios in Los Angeles, and by Michael Ilbert at MXM Studios in Stockholm, Sweden. The song was mixed by Serban Ghenea at Mixstar Studios in Virginia Beach, Virginia, and mastered by Tom Coyne at Sterling Sound Studio in New York. It is a pop track featuring heavy, stomping drums. Jem Aswad of Billboard compared its stomping beats to those of Gwen Stefani's 2005 single "Hollaback Girl", while The Observer Kitty Empire likened the production to that of English singer Charli XCX. The chorus consists of repetitive phrases, "Now we got bad blood / You know it used to be mad love," sung by Swift with tense vocals over surging keyboard tones. Swift resents her former friend for having betrayed her, through lyrics such as "These kinda wounds, they last and they last," and "Band-aids don't fix bullet holes / You say sorry just for show."

The single version incorporates elements of hip hop. It includes two verses written and performed by Lamar. According to Britton Luke of NME, the revamped version resembles the production and structure of Rihanna's 2010 single "Rude Boy". Lamar finished his verses in a few takes with Swift during a studio session in Los Angeles, recalling that their collaboration went smoothly because "the vibe was right". He told Rolling Stone in 2017 that he was unaware of the publicized feud between Swift and Perry, saying, "That's far beyond my concern. I have to stay away from that, for sure." The remix saw additional production from Ilya Salmanzadeh, who incorporated a deeper bass.

Critical reception

The album version of "Bad Blood" was met with mixed reviews from critics, many of whom singled it out as the weakest song on 1989. Mike Diver from Clash described the song as "a litany of diary-page break-up clichés set to directionless thumps and fuzzes". Mikael Wood from the Los Angeles Times considered "Bad Blood" a generic song where Swift fails to showcase herself as a distinctive artist, felt the song's beat is similar to Perry's 2013 single "Roar". Spin Andrew Unterberger called the song "disappointingly bland" as it fails to showcase Swift's traditionally vivid songwriting. Writing for Vulture, Lindsay Zoladz felt that the song represented "brainless, evil pop" that Swift had disdained.

On a more positive side, The Quietus writer Amy Pettifier considered "Bad Blood" one of the songs on 1989 that are "crammed with merit", calling it "all sass and bile". Entertainment Weekly Adam Markovitz said that the track had potentials to become a chart success and listed it as one of the best songs on the album. Consequence reviewer Sasha Geffen applauded the song's heavy hip hop beats and deep basslines resulting in a defiant tune that represented Swift's new attitude, calling its production "the tightest turns Swift has ever cut". Robert Leedham from Drowned in Sound highlighted the song's "proud defiance" that recalled "iconic hardcore bands you've probably never heard of".

The remix version received praise for Lamar's guest verses and the reworked instrumental. Meanwhile, some critics felt that Lamar's radio-friendly verses were unusual of his well-known aggressive flow. Alexis Petridis of The Guardian dubbed the single "a masterstroke" with "potent and effective" verses from Lamar and an "even more anthemic" chorus compared to the album version.

Retrospectively, critics have considered "Bad Blood" one of Swift's weakest songs in her repertoire. Rankings by Rolling Stone Rob Sheffield, Paste Jane Song, and Vulture Nate Jones all ranked "Bad Blood" among the worst songs Swift had released. Nevertheless, "Bad Blood" featured on lists of the best songs of 2015 by NME (11th) and PopMatters (sixth).

Commercial performance
"Bad Blood" first charted on the US Billboard Hot 100 for two weeks in November 2014 and January 2015 as an album cut from 1989, peaking at number 78. Upon its single release, the remix version entered the Hot 100 at number 53 and the Digital Songs chart at number 26, selling 47,000 digital copies. The following week, the song topped the Billboard Hot 100 chart dated May 24, 2015, earning 385,000 digital copies in sales, 18.1 million streams, and 57 million radio impressions. Jumping 52 positions to the number-one spot, it marked one of the largest jumps to the top in Billboard chart history. "Bad Blood" was Swift's fourth Hot 100 number one and 1989 third, making Swift the first artist since Adele with her 2011 album 21 to yield three chart toppers from the same album. It was Lamar's first number one and second top-10 entry.

"Bad Blood" dropped to number two after spending a week at number one. It spent five consecutive weeks at number two, blocked from the top by "See You Again" by Wiz Khalifa and Charlie Puth. On Billboard's airplay charts, "Bad Blood" reached number one on the Pop Songs (Mainstream Top 40) chart, a pop-focused airplay chart, in its fifth charting week. It was the fastest song to top the chart since Nelly's "Over and Over" (2004) featuring Tim McGraw, which spent three weeks before ascending to the number-one spot. In the week ending July 12, 2015, "Bad Blood" broke the record for the most single-week plays in the Pop Songs chart's 22-year history, besting the previous record by Wiz Khalifa and Charlie Puth's "See You Again". The single additionally peaked atop the Adult Top 40 chart. "Bad Blood" was the 10th-best-selling song of 2015 in the US, selling 2.584 million digital copies. The single has been certified 6× Platinum, based on sales and on-demand streams, by the Recording Industry Association of America (RIAA). By July 2019, it had sold 3.2 million digital copies in the US.

The single also topped the charts in Australia, Canada, New Zealand, and Scotland. It peaked within the top five on charts of South Africa (two), Lebanon (four), and the United Kingdom (four). "Bad Blood" has received multi-platinum certifications in Australia (3× Platinum) and Canada (3× Platinum), platinum certification in the United Kingdom, and gold in New Zealand.

Music video

Development and production

"Bad Blood" was supported by a high-budget music video directed by Joseph Kahn and produced by Swift. It was filmed in Los Angeles on April 12, 2015, and premiered at the 2015 Billboard Music Awards on May 17, 2015. The video features an ensemble cast consisting of singers and fashion models, whose public appearances with Swift during the subsequent 1989 World Tour led the media to call them Swift's "squad". Each member of the cast chose her character's name. The cast include (in order of appearance): Catastrophe (Swift), Arsyn (Selena Gomez), Welvin da Great (Lamar), Lucky Fiori (Lena Dunham), The Trinity (Hailee Steinfeld), Dilemma (Serayah), Slay-Z (Gigi Hadid), Destructa X (Ellie Goulding), Homeslice (Martha Hunt), Mother Chucker (Cara Delevingne), Cut Throat (Zendaya), The Crimson Curse (Hayley Williams), Frostbyte (Lily Aldridge), Knockout (Karlie Kloss), Domino (Jessica Alba), Justice (Mariska Hargitay), Luna (Ellen Pompeo), and Headmistress (Cindy Crawford).

Set in a fictional London, the music video starts with Catastrophe (Swift) and her partner, Arsyn (Gomez), fighting off a group of men in a corporate office for a mysterious briefcase. When all of the men are defeated, Arsyn double crosses Catastrophe by stealing the briefcase in her hand and kicking her out of a window. The song begins with Catastrophe lying on a broken car, as Welvin da Great begins his rap verse and Lucky Fiori smokes a cigar. Catastrophe is shown being nursed back to health by a trio of girls called The Trinity, and after some time, she is ready to start training for her revenge. When her training is complete, Catastrophe and her friends strike out to exact their revenge on Arsyn and her masked henchwomen. The two teams approach each other in what seems to be slow motion while an enormous explosion goes off in the background, blotting out the London skyline, and the video ends with Catastrophe and Arsyn simultaneously striking each other in the face.

Reception

The video received positive feedback regarding its production and styling, with comments pointing out several references to action movies. Rolling Stone described it as a "futuristic neo-noir" video. Daniel D'Addario of Time called it Swift's "most elaborate" music video yet, and compared its visuals to those of Sin City. Slate agreed and found other film inspirations: "Along the way, they pay homage to countless films. Besides the video's Robocop premise, there's its Sin City aesthetic, its nod to Tron'''s light cycles, and its Kill Bill-like fight in the snow." Billboard drew parallels between the video and the music videos of Britney Spears's "Toxic" and "Womanizer", which were both directed by Kahn. The video broke Vevo's 24-hour viewing record by accumulating 20.1 million views in its first day of release, which was later broken by Adele's "Hello" in October 2015, with 27.7 million views in the first 24 hours.

The video's content, allegedly to be about Swift's feud with Katy Perry, drew criticism from some commentators regarding its allegedly anti-feminist message contradicting Swift's feminist identity. Jennifer Gannon from The Irish Times observed that Swift's celebrity friends were a tool for her to build a cult of personality rather than female empowerment, writing: "Her intentions may be honourable but tangled up within this complicated web of victimhood and tired gossip is her own form of girl power." The Atlantic Spencer Kornharber defended the video, describing it as Swift's effort to counterattack "old stereotypes about women as inherently catty ... and that females must necessarily compete for the top spot in arenas from music to dating". Hannelore Roth, a literature professor, acknowledged Swift's feminist identity, but argued that the cast featured in the video implied that feminism is only accessible to rich and attractive women. Roth also noted that, since Welvin da Great (Lamar's character) appears to be the ringleader behind these women, the video proves to be "just a violent, pre-modern copy of the patriarchal structures at the office". In a retrospective review, Consequence critic Mary Siroky called the video for "Bad Blood": "The Avengers of music videos".

Accolades

"Bad Blood" was nominated for Best Pop Duo/Group Performance, and won Best Music Video at the 58th Annual Grammy Awards in 2016. At the 2015 MTV Video Music Awards, the music video for "Bad Blood" received eight nominations and won two: Video of the Year and Best Collaboration. The song was one of the awarded songs at the 2016 ASCAP Pop Music Awards and the 2016 BMI Awards, where Swift became the first woman to win a prize named after its recipient, the Taylor Swift Award.

The song received accolades at fan-voted awards such as Teen Choice Awards (including Choice Music - Collaboration), MTV Europe Music Awards, Radio Disney Music Awards and the Philippines' Myx Music Award. It received nominations at the American Music Awards (for Collaboration of the Year), People's Choice Awards, Nickelodeon Kids' Choice Awards and iHeartRadio Music Awards. Its music video won accolades at the UK Music Video Awards, Mexico's Telehit Awards and France's NRJ Music Award.

 Live performances and other usage 

At the 2015 MTV Video Music Awards, Swift performed "Bad Blood" in a joint performance with Nicki Minaj; the two also performed "Trini Dem Girls" and "The Night Is Still Young", taken from Minaj's album The Pinkprint (2014). Swift included "Bad Blood" on the set list of the 1989 World Tour, which was launched in support of 1989 and ran through 2015. She also included the song on the set list for her 2018 Reputation Stadium Tour, where she performed it as part of a medley with her previous single "Should've Said No" (2008), and the Eras Tour (2023).

The song has been featured in several occasions. English rock band Drenge covered the song for BBC Radio 1's live session on June 23, 2015. The animated web series How It Should Have Ended released a parody video based on "Bad Blood", titled "Bat Blood", in September 2015. "Bat Blood" parodies the marketing of the 2015 film Batman v Superman: Dawn of Justice. Anthony Rizzo of the New York Yankees used "Bad Blood" as one of his walk-up songs during his time as a member of the Chicago Cubs in the 2015 and 2016 seasons. Canadian rapper-singer Drake included the song in his advertisement for Apple Music in November 2016.

Rock singer Ryan Adams covered "Bad Blood" as part of his track-by-track interpretation of Swift's 1989. Adams's version is a guitar-driven alt-country song, as opposed to the original's electronic production. He released "Bad Blood" as a single preceding the release of his 1989 cover on September 17, 2015, through Apple Music's Beats 1 radio. Andrew Unterberger from Spin preferred Adams's stripped-down version to Swift's original song, and Annie Zaleski of The A.V. Club called it "the quintessential Adams-style alt-country shuffle." Adams's "Bad Blood" peaked at number 25 on the Ultratop chart of Belgian Wallonia, and number 36 on Billboard Rock Airplay chart.

A snippet of the re-recorded version of "Bad Blood", titled "Bad Blood (Taylor's Version)", is featured in the 2022 animated film DC League of Super-Pets. The song is a part of the re-recorded music from Swift following the dispute over the ownership of the masters of her older discography.

Credits and personnel
Credits for the album version are adapted from liner notes of 1989'', and credits for the remix version are adapted from Tidal.

 Taylor Swift – vocals, backing vocals, songwriter
 Kendrick Lamar – featured vocals, backing vocals, songwriter
 Max Martin – producer, songwriter, programmer, keyboards, piano
 Shellback – backing vocals, producer, songwriter, programmer, acoustic guitar, bass guitar, keyboards, drums, percussion, sounds (stomps and knees)
 Ilya Salmanzadeh – backing vocals, producer, programmer, recording engineer
 Michael Ilbert – recording engineer
 Sam Holland – recording engineer
 Ben Sedano – assistant recording engineer
 Cory Bice – assistant recording engineer
 Peter Carlsson – Pro Tools engineer
 Serban Ghenea – mixing engineer
 John Hanes – mixer
 Tom Coyne – mastering engineer

Charts

Weekly charts

Year-end charts

Certifications

Release history

See also
 List of number-one singles of 2015 (Australia)
 List of number-one singles from the 2010s (New Zealand)
 List of Canadian Hot 100 number-one singles of 2015
 List of Billboard Hot 100 number ones of 2015
 List of number-one digital songs of 2015 (US)
 List of Billboard Mainstream Top 40 number-one songs of 2015
 List of Scottish number-one singles of 2015

Footnotes

References

2014 songs
2015 singles
Billboard Hot 100 number-one singles
Canadian Hot 100 number-one singles
Kendrick Lamar songs
MTV Video of the Year Award
Grammy Award for Best Short Form Music Video
Music videos directed by Joseph Kahn
Ryan Adams songs
Song recordings produced by Max Martin
Song recordings produced by Shellback (record producer)
Song recordings produced by Ilya Salmanzadeh
Songs written by Kendrick Lamar
Songs written by Max Martin
Songs written by Shellback (record producer)
Songs written by Taylor Swift
Taylor Swift songs
Number-one singles in Australia
Number-one singles in New Zealand
Number-one singles in Scotland
Big Machine Records singles
Songs containing the I–V-vi-IV progression
Diss tracks